Fanny Bullock Workman (January 8, 1859 – January 22, 1925) was an American geographer, cartographer, explorer, travel writer, and mountaineer, notably in the Himalayas. She was one of the first female professional mountaineers; she not only explored but also wrote about her adventures. She set several women's altitude records, published eight travel books with her husband, and championed women's rights and women's suffrage.

Born to a wealthy family, Workman was educated in the finest schools available to women and traveled in Europe. Her marriage to  cemented these advantages, and, after being introduced to climbing in New Hampshire, Fanny Workman traveled the world with him. They were able to capitalize on their wealth and connections to voyage around Europe, North Africa, and Asia. The couple had two children, but Fanny Workman was not a motherly type; they left their children in schools and with nurses, and Workman saw herself as a New Woman who could equal any man. The Workmans began their travels with bicycle tours of Switzerland, France, Italy, Spain, Algeria and India. They cycled thousands of miles, sleeping wherever they could find shelter. They wrote books about each trip and Fanny frequently commented on the state of the lives of women that she saw. Their early bicycle tour narratives were better received than their mountaineering books.

At the end of their cycling trip through India, the couple escaped to the Western Himalaya and the Karakoram for the summer months, where they were introduced to high-altitude climbing. They returned to this then-unexplored region eight times over the next 14 years. Despite not having modern climbing equipment, the Workmans explored several glaciers and reached the summit of several mountains, eventually reaching  on Pinnacle Peak, a women's altitude record at the time. They organized multiyear expeditions but struggled to remain on good terms with the local labor force. Coming from a position of American privilege and wealth, they failed to understand the position of the native workers and had difficulty finding and negotiating for reliable porters.

After their trips to the Himalaya, the Workmans gave lectures about their travels. They were invited to learned societies; Fanny Workman became the first American woman to lecture at the Sorbonne and the second to speak at the Royal Geographical Society. She received many medals of honor from European climbing and geographical societies and was recognized as one of the foremost climbers of her day. She demonstrated that a woman could climb in high altitudes just as well as a man and helped break down the gender barrier in mountaineering.

Early life

Workman was born January 8, 1859, in Worcester, Massachusetts, to a wealthy and elite family descended from the Pilgrims; she was the youngest of three children. Her mother was Elvira Hazard, and her father was Alexander H. Bullock, businessman and Republican Massachusetts governor. Fanny was educated by governesses before attending Miss Graham's Finishing School in New York City, after which she spent time in Paris, and then Dresden. Thomas Pauly writes in his short biography of Workman that  "early on Fanny chafed at the constraints of her privilege".  A small number of her stories from this time survive, describing her interest in adventure. In one, "A Vacation Episode", she describes a beautiful and aristocratic English girl who is contemptuous of society. She runs away to Grindelwald, becoming an excellent alpinist and marrying an American. The story encapsulates much of Fanny's own life: wanderlust, a love of the mountains, and a commitment to women's rights.  In 1886, she published a short story, set during the First Indian War, in New York Magazine about "the capture and rescue of a white girl"; a reviewer of the story stated that it was "told in a very pleasant and infatuating style".

In 1879, Fanny returned to the United States and on June 16, 1882, married William Hunter Workman, a man 12 years her senior. He was also from a wealthy and educated family, having attended Yale and having received his medical training at Harvard. In 1884 they had a daughter, Rachel.

William introduced Fanny to climbing after their marriage, and together they spent many summers in the White Mountains in New Hampshire; here she summited Mount Washington several times. Climbing in the Northeastern United States allowed Fanny to develop her abilities together with other women. Unlike European clubs, American climbing clubs in the White Mountains allowed women members and encouraged women to climb. They promoted a new vision of the American woman, one who was both domestic and athletic, and Workman took to this image with enthusiasm. By 1886, women sometimes outnumbered men on hiking expeditions in New England. In her paper on the gender dynamics of climbing in the region, Jenny Ernie-Steighner states that this formative experience shaped Workman's commitment to women's rights, pointing out that "no other well-known international mountaineers of the time, male or female, spoke as openly and fervently about women's rights". However, both of the Workmans disliked the provincial nature of life in Worcester, where they resided, and yearned to live in Europe. After both Fanny's and William's fathers died, leaving them enormous estates, the couple embarked on their first major European trip, a tour of Scandinavia and Germany.

Move to Europe and cycling tours

In 1889 the Workman family relocated to Germany citing William's health, although Pauly speculates that this may have been merely a pretext, for he recovered surprisingly quickly. The couple's second child, Siegfried, was born shortly after they arrived in Dresden. Fanny chose not to conform to the traditionally circumscribed roles of wife and mother, and became an author and adventurer.  She lived a vigorous life that diverged from idealized femininity in the 1800s.  As a feminist, Fanny considered herself an example of the idea that women could equal and excel over men in the arduous life, and embodied the New Woman ethos of the day. Moreover, as Miller points out in her book about women explorers, since the ideal family of the time was a large one and information about birth control was not easily available, William's medical knowledge must have been invaluable. The Workmans left their children with nurses while they took long trips. In 1893, Siegfried died from a combination of influenza and pneumonia.  After his death, according to Pauly, Workman, through her bicycle tours, "aggressively pursued an alternative identity, one that liberated her from the conventional responsibilities of wife and mother and allowed for her interests and ambitions".  They missed their daughter's wedding to Sir Alexander MacRobert in 1911 while exploring in the Karakoram.

Together, the Workmans explored the world and co-wrote eight travel books that describe the people, art, and architecture of the areas they journeyed through.  The Workmans were aware of their contribution to the genre of travel writing, as they commented on other writers in their own works. Their mountaineering narratives said little about the culture of those remote and sparsely inhabited regions; they included both lyrical descriptions of the sunset, for example, for their popular audience and detailed explanations of geographical features, such as glaciers, for their scientific readership.  Fanny and William added scientific elements to their writings to appeal to authoritative organizations such as the Royal Geographical Society; Fanny also believed the science would make her more legitimate in the eyes of the climbing community, but it cost her readers. In general, their bicycling tour narratives were better received than those about their mountaineering exploits. Fanny wrote the majority of these travel books herself, and in them she commented extensively on the plight of women wherever she traveled.

Stephanie Tingley writes, in her encyclopedia entry on Workman's travel writing, that there is an implied feminist criticism of the hardships women experienced and the inferior status of the women in the societies she encountered. As a strong-willed, outspoken supporter of women's rights, Workman used their travels to demonstrate her own abilities and to highlight the inequities other women lived under.  However, their travel books are written in the first-person plural or third-person singular, so it is difficult to decisively attribute views or voices to either William or Fanny. The Workmans' works are colonialist in that they describe the people they meet and observe as "exotic or unusual, at worst as primitive or even subhuman". However, at times they make it clear that the people they encounter see them in a similar light, demonstrating that they were sometimes aware of their own biases.

Between 1888 and 1893, the Workmans took bicycling tours of Switzerland, France, and Italy. In 1891, Fanny became one of the first women to climb Mont Blanc. She also was one of the first women to climb the Jungfrau and the Matterhorn; her guide was Peter Taugwalder, who had made the first ascent with Edward Whymper. In 1893, the couple decided to explore areas beyond Europe and headed for Algeria, Indochina, and India. These longer trips were Fanny's idea. Afterwards, they co-wrote Sketches Awheel in Modern Iberia about their trip. In it, they described Spain as "rustic, quaint, and charming",. In Algerian Memories Fanny focused on the beauty and romance of the countryside, but also highlighted the abuse and neglect of women in Algerian society.

India 

The Workmans' trip to India, Burma, Ceylon, and Java lasted two and a half years, beginning in November 1897, and covered . At the time, Fanny was 38 and William 50. To ensure they had access to supplies, they rode along major thoroughfares near railways, and were sometimes forced to sleep in railway waiting rooms if no other accommodation was available. They carried minimal supplies, including tea, sugar, biscuits, cheese, tinned meats, water, pillows, a blanket for each of them, writing materials, and medical and repair kits.

The trip was grueling. They often had little food or water, dealt with swarms of mosquitoes, fixed as many as 40 bicycle tire punctures per day, and slept in rat-infested quarters. Fanny Workman's book, written after the trip, highlighted the ancient architecture that they had seen rather than the contemporary local cultures. Mrs Workman mentions in "My Asiatic Wanderings" about India "I have wheeled through much enchanting scenery, in the palm and banyan grooves of Orissa, Over the green and scarlet slopes of the Terai... But I have never cycled 1200 miles in a country so continuously beautiful." The Workmans possessed an unusual amount of historical knowledge about India for Westerners of the time and had read the Jakata, Mahabharata, and Ramayana before their trip. They were eager to learn about the culture that had produced these epics and spent more time learning about ancient history than interacting with living people.

Labor issues 
During the summer of 1898, the couple decided to escape the heat and explore the western Himalaya and Karakoram. After that, they intended to explore the area around Kanchenjunga in Sikkim, and then finally travel to the mountains bordering Bhutan on the east. Bureaucratic difficulties and weather problems abounded and impeded their plans. The most serious problems concerned labor. They hired 45 porters, outfitted them for basic mountain travel, and bought provisions, but costs skyrocketed as news of wealthy Americans circulated in the villages. They could not leave until October 3 and by then cold weather was approaching. Three days into their journey the Workmans reached snow and the porters rebelled; they refused to work in such cold conditions and forced the entire party to return to Darjeeling.

The Workmans struggled with labor problems continually, needing local porters to carry gear for them because they could not carry a sufficient amount for themselves for a multi-month expedition.  They had to transport Mummery tents, eider sleeping bags, camera equipment, scientific instruments, and a large supply of food. The porters were skeptical of the entire venture. The locals rarely climbed mountains and were not used to taking orders from a woman, which made Fanny's position difficult. The Workmans tried to solve these problems with condescension and high-handedness. Kenneth Mason maintains in his history of Himalayan mountaineering, written in 1955, that "The Workmans were, on their journeys, the victims of their own faults. They were too impatient and rarely tried to understand the mentality of the porters and so did not get the best out of them." Labor problems beset all of their expeditions because, as Miller puts it, "Almost alone of Victorian travellers, the Workmans had absolutely no sympathy or even common-sense understanding of the local people, into whose poor and remote villages they burst with trains of followers demanding service and supplies." In her chapter on Workman, Miller argues that the couple, being American, did not have the same sense of caste or class that British explorers had: "the Workmans, like most of their countrymen, plunged in their enterprises headlong, expecting their enormous energy to overcome all obstacles. They were justifiably criticized by the British for their callous, incompetent behavior toward the Indians."

Mountaineering in the Himalayas 

After travelling to the Himalaya the first time, the Workmans became entranced with climbing and mountaineering. Over a span of 14 years, they traveled eight times to the area, which at the time was almost completely unexplored and unmapped. Their trips were made without the benefit of modern lightweight equipment, freeze-dried foods, sunblock, or radios. On each expedition, they explored, surveyed, and photographed, ultimately reporting on their findings and creating maps. The couple shared and alternated responsibilities; one year Fanny would organize the logistics of their journey and William would work on the scientific projects and the next year they would reverse roles.

After their first trip to the Himalaya and subsequent labor problems, the Workmans hired Matthias Zurbriggen, the best and most experienced mountain climbing guide of the time. Thus, in 1899, with 50 local porters and Zurbriggen, the Workmans began to explore the Biafo Glacier in the Karakoram, but dangerous crevasses and poor weather forced them instead to shift to the Skoro La Glacier and the unclimbed peaks around it. They reached Siegfriedhorn, an 18,600-foot (5,700 m) summit that she named after her son, giving Fanny an altitude record for women at the time. Admiring the view of a far-off mountain, they commented on the grand view: they were looking at K2, the second-highest mountain in the world. Fanny Workman may have been the first woman recorded to have seen it. Finally, they climbed Koser Gunge, giving Fanny her third successive altitude record. In the morning, they climbed a wall that measured , and were buffeted by winds. During the summit push, Fanny's fingers were so numb that she could no longer hold her ice ax and one of the porters abandoned them. Pauly writes, "propelled to the summit by adrenalin and desperation, the foursome lingered only long enough for their instruments to assess that the temperature was ten degrees Fahrenheit [−12 °C] and their elevation was 21,000 feet." Fanny was a "slow, relentless, and intrepid" climber; "bearlike, she solidly planted one foot and then groped for another secure grip with the other". Climbing at the beginning of the 20th century, she did not have specialized equipment like pitons or carabiners. She was able to climb to such heights, Pauly argues, because of "her dauntless persistence and her immunity to altitude sickness".

As soon as she was able, Fanny Workman published accounts of her feats, such as an article in the Scottish Geographical Magazine. Writing about this trip at length in In the Ice World of the Himalayas, Fanny made efforts to include scientific information and experiments, touting her own modified barometer as superior, but scholarly critics were unimpressed and pointed out her lack of scientific knowledge. Popular reviewers, on the other hand, enjoyed the book, with one concluding, "We have no hesitation in saying that Dr. and Mrs. Workman have written one of the most remarkable books of travel of recent years."

In 1902, the Workmans returned to the Himalaya and became the first Westerners to explore the Chogo Lungma Glacier, starting in Arandu. They hired 80 porters and took four tons of supplies, but their explorations were limited by near-constant snow and a 60-hour storm. In 1903, they trekked to the Hoh Lumba Glacier with guide Cyprien Savoye. They also attempted to climb the nearby mountain they called Pyramid Peak (later renamed Spantik, as part of the Spantik-Sosbun Mountains). They ascended a  peak, giving Fanny a new altitude record. William and a porter climbed toward the needle-like spire that was the expedition's goal. However, he abandoned the summit attempt a few hundred feet from the top because he realized they could not have descended to a safe altitude before altitude sickness set in.

After returning from their travels, the Workmans lectured all over Europe. Fanny lectured in English, German, or French, as the occasion required. At one talk in Lyon, France, 1000 people crowded into the auditorium and 700 were turned away. In 1905 Fanny became the second woman to address the Royal Geographical Society. (Isabella Bird Bishop had been the first in May 1897.) Her talk was mentioned in The Times.

The Workmans returned to Kashmir in 1906, and were the first Westerners to explore the Nun Kun massif. For this trip, the couple hired six Italian porters from the Alps, 200 local porters, and Savoye returned as guide. As Isserman, Weaver and Molenaar explain in their history of Himalayan mountaineering, the Workmans despised the local porters but were forced to recruit them; "their otherwise invaluable books read like one long, anguished harangue against the lazy, lying, thieving, mutinous cheats on whom they unhappily depended for local support". Despite labor problems, the Workmans spent the night higher than any previous mountaineers— on top of Z1 on Nun Kun—at what they called "Camp America". William wrote of Fanny: 
The map the Workmans made during this trip was of low quality. According to Mason, the couple did not have a good sense of topographical direction, which meant that their measurements were inaccurate and unusable by the Survey of India.

Pinnacle Peak and altitude record

From , at the age of 47 in 1906, Workman climbed up to Pinnacle Peak (which she believed to be ), a subsidiary peak in the Nun Kun massif of the western Himalaya. It was her greatest mountaineering achievement.  As Isserman, Weaver and Molenaar point out, the fact that she "climbed the mountain at all, without benefit of modern equipment and encumbered by her voluminous skirts, speaks to both her ability and resolve". She set an altitude record for women that would stand until Hetti Dhyrenfurth's 1934 ascent of Sia Kangri C. Believing that they had both climbed above the 23,000-foot (7,000 m) mark, Fanny and William now considered themselves the leading experts on climbing at altitude.

Workman vigorously defended her Pinnacle Peak altitude record against all other claimants, especially Annie Smith Peck. In 1908, Peck claimed a new record with her climb of Peru's Huascarán, which she believed to be . However, she was misinformed as to the peak's height and exaggerated distances she could not measure. Workman was so competitive that she paid a team of French surveyors from the Service Géographique de l'Armée US$13,000 to measure the elevation of the mountain, which was actually , confirming her record. Pauly explains, "Ironically, her determination to prove herself the equal of any man at lofty elevations culminated with a withering attack on an American woman who tried to surpass her". Determined to be the best woman, Workman was also a meticulous record-keeper so that she could prove her accomplishments.  Pauly concludes, "If Fanny Workman ever receives the recognition she deserves for her feminist determination to excel at this then-male sport, she will surely be remembered as much for her insistence upon accurate record-keeping as for the elevations she achieved."

Hispar and Siachen glaciers

In 1908, the Workmans returned to the Karakoram and explored the 38-mile-long (61 km) Hispar Glacier in the Hunza Nagar region; they went from Gilgit to Nagir over the Hispar pass and onto the 37-mile-long (60 km) Biafo Glacier to Askole. Their total traverse of the glaciers was another record, and Fanny became the first woman to travel across any Himalayan glacier of this size. They were the first to explore its many side glaciers and the maps created by their Italian porters helped map the region for the first time. They recorded the physiological effects of high altitude, studied glaciers and ice pinnacles, and took meteorological measurements, including altitude data recorded with both aneroid barometers and boiling point thermometers.

The Workmans' exploration of the Rose Glacier and the 45-mile-long (72 km) Siachen Glacier in Baltistan around Masherbrum in 1911 and 1912 was the most important achievement of their careers because it was the widest and longest subpolar glacier in the world and at the time, the least explored and accessible glacier as well. For two months, the Workmans explored the 45-mile glacier, climbed several mountains, and mapped the area. On this expedition, one of their Italian guides fell into a crevasse and died; Fanny was lucky to escape. The others were badly shaken but decided to carry on. Fanny led them across the Sia La pass near the head of the Siachen Glacier and through a previously unexplored region to the Kaberi Glacier. This exploration and the resulting book were among her greatest accomplishments. As she wrote in her book about the trip, Two Summers in the Ice-Wilds of Eastern Karakoram, she organized and led this expedition: "Dr. Hunter Workman accompanied me, this time, in charge with me of commissariat and as photographer and glacialist, but I was the responsible leader of this expedition, and on my efforts, in a large measure, must depend the success or failure of it". At one 21,000-foot (6,400 m) plateau, Fanny unfurled a "Votes for Women" newspaper and her husband snapped an iconic picture. They took trained Alpine guides and surveyors including Grant Peterkin and Surjan Singh, whose contributions ensured that, unlike numerous other maps the Workmans helped create, their map of the Siachen Glacier remained unchallenged for many years.

Later life and death

After their 1908–12 trip, the couple stopped exploring and turned to writing and lecturing, primarily because of the onset of World War I in 1914. Workman became the first American woman to lecture at the Sorbonne in Paris. She was also one of the first women admitted as a member of the Royal Geographical Society, a distinction she earned because her publications included scientific reflections on glaciation and other phenomena. She also earned medals of honor from 10 European geographical societies and was eventually elected a member of the American Alpine Club, Royal Asiatic Society, Club Alpino Italiano, Deutscher und Österreichischer Alpenverein, and Club alpin français. She was very proud of these achievements, listing them on the title pages of her books.

Workman fell ill in 1917 and died after a long illness in 1925 in Cannes, France. Her ashes were buried in Massachusetts, and are now reinterred along with her husband's, under a monument in Worcester, Massachusetts' Rural Cemetery that reads "Pioneer Himalayan Explorers". In her will, she left $125,000 to four colleges, Radcliffe, Wellesley, Smith, and Bryn Mawr; the bequests were demonstrative of her long-lasting interest in the advancement of women's rights, and her belief that women were the equals of men.

Legacy

Women in climbing
Along with Annie Smith Peck, Workman was recognized during the early 20th century as one of the most famous female climbers in the world. Their rivalry demonstrated that women could climb the most remote and difficult terrain on the planet. Women had climbed regularly in the Alps since the 1850s, but in the Himalayas, mountaineering had been dominated by wealthy English men. No other women, however, climbed in the Himalaya until well after World War I, by which time improvements in equipment and organization had shifted that nature of risks and difficulties of expeditions.

Workman, herself an ardent feminist and a supporter of women's suffrage, wanted her readers to understand how her contributions and achievements reflected all women's potential. In her writings, Workman described herself as "questioning or violating the norms of Victorian female propriety". She demonstrated that women were strong enough to thrive outside the home by showing how easy it was for her to endure strenuous physical activities like bicycling long distances in hot, humid places or mountaineering in cold temperatures and high altitudes. Workman challenged a masculine realm; her obituary in the Alpine Journal alluded to the challenges she faced, saying that she "felt that she suffered from 'sex antagonism'". The author of the piece added: "it is possible that some unconscious feeling let us say of the novelty of a woman's intrusion into the domain of exploration so long reserved to man, may in some quarters have existed ... there tended to arise ... an atmosphere shall we say of aloofness?" However, in her study of Victorian mountaineering, Ann Colley suggests that gender discrimination was more overt at lower elevations and in regular life than at higher elevations, such as in the Himalaya. Colley states, "Away from such petty opinion emanating from society pressures, up high, above the snow line or in distant regions, women climbers could more fully experience equality and power ... If they chose, they could be just as sportsmanlike or competitive as the men." In her entry about Workman in the Dictionary of Literary Biography, Tingley sums Workman up as "an aggressive, determined, and uncompromising turn-of-the-century American woman traveler" and "one of the first women to work as a professional mountaineer and surveyor and to write about the expeditions she and her husband took to the most remote reaches of the Himalaya. She was an outspoken advocate of woman's suffrage and made it clear that she considered herself to be a role model for other women travelers and mountaineers."

As a result of the money Workman left in her will, Wellesley College offers a $16,000 fellowship named after Fanny Workman for graduate study in any discipline to a Wellesley graduate each year. Bryn Mawr established a Fanny Bullock Workman Traveling Fellowship, which is awarded to Ph.D candidates in Archaeology or Art History when funds permit.

Exploration of the Himalaya
The many books and articles produced by the Workmans are "still useful" according to Mason, especially for their photographs and illustrations, but their maps are "deceptive and not always reliable". One assessment states that although the Workmans excelled at describing meteorological conditions, glaciology, and how high altitudes affected human health and fitness, they were poor topographers.  The Workmans were some of the first mountaineers to grasp that the Himalaya were the place for the ultimate climbing challenge and their explorations helped evolve mountaineering from strenuous recreation into a serious, regulated competitive sport. According to Isserman, Weaver and Molenaar, "that the Workmans were intrepid explorers and climbers none could possibly doubt, but they were also aggressive self-promoters who in their eagerness for recognition and honors sometimes exaggerated the originality and significance of what they had done." In their final assessment, Isserman, Weaver and Molenaar say "they had logged more miles and climbed more peaks than anyone to date; they had produced five sumptuously illustrated and widely read expedition volumes; and by simple virtue of her sex Fanny of course had set an invaluable Himalayan precedent. But the Workmans were not great mountaineers. At their best they were vigorous and competent patrons who followed capably in the hard-won steps of their Italian guides." However, in his chapter on Workman, Pauly writes that "the few recent accounts of Fanny Workman have tended to slight or belittle her achievements, but contemporaries, unaware of the far greater accomplishments to come, held the Workmans in high regard." They were the first Americans to explore the Himalaya in depth and break the British monopoly over Himalayan mountaineering.

Bibliography

Books

Articles
 "Among the Great Himalayan Glaciers." National Geographic 13 (Nov. 1920): 405–406.
 "First Ascents of the Hoh Lumba and the Sosbon Glaciers in the Northwest Himalayas." Independent 55 (December 31, 1903): 3108–12.
 Through Town and Jungle: Fourteen Thousand Miles A-Wheel Among the Temples and People of the Indian Plain. London: Unwin, 1904.
 "Miss Peck and Mrs. Workman." Scientific American 102 (Feb 12 and April 16, 1910); 143, 319.
 "Recent First Ascents in the Himalaya." Independent 68 (June 2, 1910): 1202–10.
 "Conquering the Great Rose." Harper 129 (June 1914): 44–45.
 "Exploring the Rose." Independent 85 (January 10, 1916): 54–56.
 "Four Miles High." Independent 86 (June 5, 1916): 377–378.

See also
List of climbers and mountaineers

References

Cited sources

Further reading
Waterman, Laura (2000). “The Two Highest Women in the World: A Story,” in Laura and Guy Waterman, A Fine Kind of Madness:  Mountain Adventures Tall and True, Seattle, WA:  The Mountaineers Books, 2000.

External links

1859 births
1925 deaths
American explorers
American geographers
American mountain climbers
Female climbers
Female explorers
Writers from Worcester, Massachusetts
Burials at Rural Cemetery (Worcester, Massachusetts)
American cartographers
American travel writers
American women travel writers